This is a list of U.S. states and federal district by the number of billionaires as of 15 Sep 2020; the total of 642 billionaires includes 19 people whose state of residence is unknown at 15 Sep 2020, most of whom hold dual U.S. citizenship. The population ratio is based on 1 Jul 2019 U.S. Census Bureau data. The list of billionaires is compiled annually by Forbes magazine.

Table

See also
List of countries by number of billionaires

References

External links

From a Utah Basement to SAP's $8 Billion Buy: The Brothers Behind Qualtrics Are Tech's Newest Billionaires
Billionaires 2019
Here Are The States With The Most Billionaires

Billionaires
United States, Billionaires